Parliamentary elections were held in Bulgaria on 18 December 1949.  They were the first legislative elections held under undisguised Communist rule.  With all meaningful opposition having been destroyed, voters were presented with a single list from the Fatherland Front, dominated by the Bulgarian Communist Party.  According to official figures, almost 4.7 million people turned out to vote and only 980 of them voted against the list, while another 109,963 ballots were invalid or blank.  Voter turnout was reportedly 98.9 percent.

Results

References

Bulgaria
1949 in Bulgaria
Parliamentary elections in Bulgaria
One-party elections
December 1949 events in Europe
1949 elections in Bulgaria